Telemach (full legal name: Telemach d.o.o.) is the leading cable television and broadband internet service provider, and the largest alternative fixed line operator in Bosnia and Herzegovina. The company is part of United Group, owned by the British BC Partners. It was founded as M&H Company in Sarajevo in 2005 and was one of the three companies merged to form United Group in 2007.

Market
Telemach services are available in the following Bosnian cities:
 Sarajevo (since 2010)
 Mostar (since 2011)
 Zenica, Breza (since 2012)
 Kakanj, Travnik, Vitez, Visoko (since 2013)
Bugojno (since 2015; ex VKT-net)
 Tuzla, Lukavac, Kladanj, Gračanica, Brčko, Doboj Istok, Novi Travnik, Jajce, Mrkonjić Grad, Sanski Most and Velika Kladuša (since 2017; ex BHB CABLE TV)
 Novi Travnik - (since 2016; ex Global Internet d.o.o.)
 Ilidža - (since 2016; ex ASK CATV)
 Banja Luka - (since 2020 in partnership with Trion Tel)

Services

Cable television
Telemach currently (May 2022) offers between 35-51 TV channels via cable television in six major areas (Sarajevo 35, Mostar 35, Zenica, Kakanj i Visoko area, Central Bosnia Canton and ex. BHB CABLE TV markets).

Digital television
Telemach offers several digital packages (EON), and there is also 32 radio stations and 48 Music Choice channels. The digital offer is unique for all areas in Bosnia and Herzegovina.

EON Start

 1 - N1 BiH HD
 2 - BHT 1 HD
 3 - RTRS
 4 - Nova BH HD
 5 - Hayat TV HD
 6 - O Kanal HD
 7 - Face TV HD
 8 - Al Jazeera Balkans HD
 9 - TVSA HD
 10 - TV Alfa
 11 - OBN HD
 12 - BN HD
 13 - Pink BH
 14 - RTV Herceg-Bosne HD
 15 - N1 HR HD
 16 - Nova TV HR HD
 17 - HRT 1 HD
 18 - HRT 2 HD
 19 - HRT 3 HD
 20 - HRT 4 HD
 21 - RTL HR HD
 22 - RTL 2 HR HD
 23 - Z1
 24 - N1 SRB HD
 25 - Nova S HD
 26 - Prva TV HD
 27 - Prva Plus HD
 28 - Prva World HD
 29 - Prva Kick HD
 30 - B92
 31 - Brainz HD
 32 - Insajder TV HD
 33 - FTV
 34 - BHT 1 SD
 35 - Hayat Plus
 36 - O Kanal Plus HD
 37 - HEMA TV
 38 - RTV Vogošća HD
 39 - RTV Visoko HD
 40 - NTV IC Kakanj
 41 - RTV Zenica HD
 42 - Kanal 6
 43 - TV Bugojno
 44 - Prva BH HD
 45 - RTV 7 Tuzla
 46 - TV Lukavac
 47 - TV TK
 48 - HIT TV
 49 - Izvorna TV
 50 - OTV Valentino
 51 - RTV Sana
 52 - City TV HD
 53 - TV Jablanica
 54 - Posavina TV
 55 - RTRS PLUS
 56 - ATV Banja Luka
 57 - RTV IS
 58 - BIR TV HD
 59 - MTV Igman HD
 60 - Televizija 5 HD
 61 - Laudato TV
 62 - RTV Slo 1 HD
 63 - RTCG Sat HD
 64 - TV Vijesti
 65 - Nova BG HD
 66 - FOX HD
 67 - Fox Life HD
 68 - Fox Crime HD
 69 - Fox Movie HD
 70 - Epic Drama HD
 71 - AXN Adria
 72 - DIVA
 73 - Pickbox TV HD
 74 - AMC HD
 75 - TV1000
 76 - Kino TV HD
 77 - Cinema TV
 78 - Cinestar TV 1 HD
 79 - Cinestar TV 2 HD
 80 - Cinestar Fantasy HD
 81 - Cinestar Action & Thriller HD
 82 - Cinestar Comedy & Family HD
 83 - Nova Sport HD
 84 - SK 1 HD
 85 - SK 2 HD
 86 - SK 3 HD
 87 - SK 4 HD
 88 - SK 5 HD
 89 - SK 6
 90 - SK 7
 91 - SK 8
 92 - SK 9
 93 - SK 10
 94 - SK 1 HR
 95 - SK 4K
 96 - SK HD
 97 - SK Golf HD
 98 - SK Fight
 99 - SK Esports HD
 100 - Eurosport 1 HD
 101 - Eurosport 2 HD
 102 - Eurosport 4K
 103 - Pikaboo HD
 104 - Minimax
 105 - RTL Kockica HD
 106 - Nickelodeon
 107 - Vavoom HD
 108 - Cartoon Network
 109 - Disney Channel
 110 - Da Vinci HD
 111 - Nick jr.
 112 - nicktoons
 113 - Disney Junior
 114 - IDJ Kids HD
 115 - BabyTV
 116 - Hayatovci
 117 - National Geographic HD
 118 - Discovery Channel HD
 119 - DokuTV HD
 120 - History HD
 121 - Viasat History HD
 122 - Lov i Ribolov
 123 - Viasat Explore HD
 124 - Animal Planet HD
 125 - Viasat Nature HD
 126 - 24Kitchen HD
 127 - HGTV HD
 128 - Travel Channel HD
 129 - TLC Balkans HD
 130 - Fashion TV HD
 131 - Grand TV HD
 132 - Grand TV 2 HD
 133 - IDJ TV HD
 134 - Sevdah TV HD
 135 - BN Music HD
 136 - Hayat Folk
 137 - Hayat Music
 138 - O Kanal Music HD
 139 - CMC HD
 140 - Pink Music
 141 - DM SAT
 142 - K::CN 2
 143 - MTV Europe
 144 - Trace Urban HD
 145 - MTV 00s
 146 - CNN International
 147 - BBC World News
 148 - UA|TV
 149 - 1+1 International
 150 - Bloomberg TV
 151 - RTL DE
 152 - ProSieben
 153 - VOX
 154 - TRT Avaz
 155 - Rai 1
 156 - TV5 Monde
 157 – Telemach Info Channel HD

EON Basic (EON Start package + additional channels)

 1 - RTL Living HR HD
 2 - K::CN 1
 3 - Sci Fi HD
 4 - Pink Western
 5 - Pink Action
 6 - AXN Spin
 7 - Motorvision HD
 8 - Boomerang
 9 - JimJam
 10 - National Geographic Wild HD
 11 - Crime & Investigation Network
 12 - ID HD
 13 - E!
 14 - K::CN 3
 15 - Balkanika TV
 16 - Euronews HD
 17 - DW TV HD
 18 - RTL Zwei
 19 - ntv
 20 - Dorcel TV HD

EON Extended package  (EON Start, EON Basic + additional channels)

 1 - ShortsTV HD
 2 - Extreme Sports
 3 - Nickelodeon HD
 4 - Pink Kids
 5 - History 2 HD
 6 - BBC Earth HD
 7 - Planet Earth HD
 8 - Trace Sport Stars HD
 9 - Pink Plus
 10 - Pink Extra
 11 - nickmusic
 12 - MTV 80s
 13 - MTV 90s
 14 - MTV Hits
 15 - club MTV
 16 - MTV Live HD
 17 - Stingray iConcerts HD
 18 - Mezzo Live HD
 19 - Private TV
 20 - Dorcel XXX HD
 21 - Dusk TV
 22 - Hustler TV
 23 - Hustler HD
 24 - Playboy TV HD

Pink package  (including pink channels from EON Start and EON Extended package)

 1 - Pink Comedy
 2 - Pink Romance
 3 - Pink Premium HD
 4 - Pink Movies
 5 - Pink Film
 6 - Pink Thriller
 7 - Pink Crime & Mystery
 8 - Pink Soap
 9 - Pink SciFi & Fantasy
 10 - Pink Horor
 11 - Pink World Cinema
 12 - Pink Classic
 13 - Pink Serije
 14 - Pink Family
 15 - Pink Zabava
 16 - Pink Reality
 17 - Pink World
 18 - Pink Show
 19 - Pink Style
 20 - Pink Fashion
 21 - Pink Kuvar
 22 - Pink Ha Ha
 23 - Pink LOL
 24 - Pink Pedia
 25 - Pink Super Kids
 26 - Bravo Music
 27 - Pink Folk 1
 28 - Pink Folk 2
 29 - Pink Music 2
 30 - Pink Hits
 31 - Pink Hits 2
 32 - Pink n Roll
 33 - Pink Koncert
 34 - City Play

HBO Premium package

 1 - HBO HD
 2 - HBO 2 HD
 3 - HBO 3 HD
 4 - Cinemax HD
 5 - Cinemax 2 HD

Cinestar Premiere HD package

 1 - Cinestar Premiere 1 HD
 2 - Cinestar Premiere 2 HD

Zadruga Paket

 1 – Zadruga Live 1
 2 – Zadruga Live 2
 3 – Zadruga Live 3
 4 – Zadruga Live 4

Radio stations

 1 - BH Radio 1
 2 - Federalni Radio
 3 - Radio Republike Srpske
 4 - Antena Sarajevo
 5 - Radio Sarajevo
 6 - Radio Stari Grad
 7 - Radio M
 8 - Radio 8
 9 - Kiss FM
 10 - Radio Otvorena Mreža
 11 - Radio Zenica
 12 - Radio Zenit
 13 - Radio Dobre Vibracije
 14 - Običan Radio
 15 - Nes Radio
 16 - HR 1
 17 - HR 2
 18 - Radio Prvi
 19 - Antena Zagreb
 20 - Radio Dalmacija
 21 - Otvoreni radio
 22 - Play
 23 - S2
 24 - Radio Studio B
 25 - Naxi
 26 - Radio MIX
 27 - Radio Kalman
 28 - Radio Ask
 29 - Radio Breza
 30 - Narodni Radio
 31 - BIR Radio
 32 - Radiopostaja Mir Međugorje
 33 - Radio Marija

Stingray Music

 1 - Total Hits - Balkan
 2 - Balkan Retro Hits
 3 - Balkan Music / Gypsy
 4 - '60s
 5 - Soho '70s
 6 - '80s
 7 - '90s
 8 - 2000s
 9 - Revival 60s - 70s
 10 - Rewind 80s - 90s
 11 - Rock and Roll
 12 - All Day Party
 13 - Drive
 14 - Freedom
 15 - Silk (Love Songs)
 16 - Total Hits UK
 17 - Bass, Breaks and Beats
 18 - Chillout
 19 - Classic R'n'B & Soul
 20 - Dancefloor Fillers
 21 - Groove (Disco and Funk)
 22 - Hip Hop
 23 - Rock of Ages
 24 - Headbangers
 25 - Rock Anthems
 26 - Alternative
 27 - Hip-Hop/R&B UK
 28 - Cool Jazz
 29 - Jazz Classics
 30 - The Spa
 31 - Jammin'
 32 - Cocktail Lounge
 33 - Deep Blues
 34 - Classical Calm
 35 - Classical Greats
 36 - La Vita è Bella
 37 - Specials
 38 - Chansons
 39 - Country
 40 - Greek Music
 41 - Türk Müzigi
 42 - World Carnival

References

External links
 Official website
 Official website (Montenegro)

Companies of Bosnia and Herzegovina
Communications in Bosnia and Herzegovina
Telecommunications companies of Bosnia and Herzegovina
Internet service providers of Bosnia and Herzegovina
Cable television companies of Bosnia and Herzegovina
Companies based in Sarajevo
Telecommunications companies established in 2005
2007 mergers and acquisitions
2005 establishments in Bosnia and Herzegovina